"Sing, Sing, Sing (With a Swing)" is a 1936 song, with music and lyrics by Louis Prima, who first recorded it with the New Orleans Gang. Brunswick Records released it on February 28, 1936 on the 78rpm record format, with "It's Been So Long" as the B-side. The song is strongly identified with the big band and swing eras. Several have performed the piece as an instrumental, including Fletcher Henderson and, most famously, Benny Goodman.

Benny Goodman recording
On July 6, 1937, "Sing, Sing, Sing" was recorded in Hollywood with Benny Goodman on clarinet; Gene Krupa on drums; Harry James, Ziggy Elman, and Chris Griffin on trumpets; Red Ballard and Murray McEachern on trombones; Hymie Schertzer and George Koenig on alto saxophones; Art Rollini and Vido Musso on tenor saxophone; Jess Stacy on piano; Allan Reuss on guitar; and Harry Goodman on bass. The song was arranged by Jimmy Mundy.  Unlike most big band arrangements of that era, limited in length to three minutes so that they could be recorded on one side of a standard 10-inch 78-rpm record, the version which Goodman’s band recorded was an extended work. The 1937 recording lasted 8 minutes and 43 seconds, and it took up both sides of a 12-inch 78.  The recording of Goodman's 1938 Carnegie Hall live performance (with impromptu solos) took 12 minutes and 30 seconds. Mundy's arrangement incorporated "Christopher Columbus", a piece written by Chu Berry for the Fletcher Henderson band, as well as Prima's work. Fletcher Henderson recorded a vocal version in August 1936. The 1937 Benny Goodman recording was inducted into the Grammy Hall of Fame in 1982.

Ross Firestone says that the 1937 recording "bore only the slightest resemblance to the original score." Helen Ward said that the changes started spontaneously: "One night Gene just refused to stop drumming when he got to the end of the third chorus, where the tune was supposed to end, so Benny blithely picked up the clarinet and noodled along with him. Then someone else stood up and took it, and it went on from there." Firestone says the elements from "Christopher Columbus" were added this way. The title of the number as given on the Goodman recordings acknowledges the additional tune - "Sing, Sing, Sing (introducing Christopher Columbus)”.

In their 1966 book Hear Me Talkin’ To Ya: The Story Of Jazz As Told By The Men Who Made It, music critics Nat Shapiro and Nat Hentoff quote Goodman as saying, "'Sing, Sing, Sing' (which we started doing back at the Palomar on our second trip there in 1936) was a big thing, and no one-nighter was complete without it." Goodman's 1938 Carnegie Hall jazz concert performance with Christopher Columbus interpolation was different from the commercial release and from subsequent performances with the Goodman band. The personnel of the Goodman band for the Carnegie Hall concert were the same as in the 1937 recording session, except that Vernon Brown replaced Murray McEachern on trombone, and Babe Russin replaced Vido Musso on tenor saxophone.

Stacy was quoted as saying he was glad he did not know Goodman was going to let him solo, because then he would have gotten nervous and "screwed it up." For the 1955 recording recreating the Carnegie Hall performance for the movie The Benny Goodman Story, Stacy declined to participate and there was no piano solo, because he was offered only a standard daily wage for one day's work.

In popular culture

The composition has appeared in numerous films and television programs, including:

Films

 Swing Banditry (1936) Short Film (played by Georgie Stoll and His Orchestra with Virginia Dale singing)
 After the Thin Man (1936) (playing during Nick & Nora's homecoming party scene, with vocal lyrics sung by Eadie Adams)
 Hollywood Hotel (1937) (performed by Benny Goodman's Orchestra)
 Canine Caddy (1941 short film), when Mickey Mouse is intensely preparing a golf stroke
 The Benny Goodman Story (1956)
 American Pop (1981)
 Racing with the Moon (1984), pool hall scene
  Power (1986)
 Big Business (1988), during the opening scene
 New York Stories (1989)
 Awakenings (1990) when the patients leave the hospital for an afternoon at the dance hall
 Swing Kids (1993), performed by Arvid's band during a large gathering
 Manhattan Murder Mystery (1993)
 Casino (1995)
 Tower of Terror (1997)
 Deconstructing Harry (1997), with Harry's story set in Hell.
 Pollock (2000), when the characters are gathered around a radio
 Riding in Cars with Boys (2001), during a wedding reception
 The Majestic (2001), during a homecoming reception
 Below (2002), on the submarine's phonograph during several scenes. The script called for the song "I'll Be Seeing You," but the filmmakers were unable to secure the rights.
 Bright Young Things (2003)
 Swing Girls (2004)
 Gone with the Bullets (2014)
 The Wedding Ringer (2015)
 Florence Foster Jenkins (2016) (in which Hugh Grant's character dances to it)
 Swing Kids Korean (2018)
 Tove (2020)
 Finch (2021)
 Don't Worry Darling (2022)

Theater
 Dancin' (1978)
 Fosse (1999)
 Burn the Floor (1999) and spin-offs
 Phua Chu Kang: The Musical (2004)

Television
The Golden Girls episode "One for the Money" (1987) (The tune plays in one scene when Rose Nylund dances solo against Blanche Devereaux and Dorothy Zbornak at a dance marathon.)
Chips Ahoy advert (1993)
Daddy Dearest (1993) theme tune
The Simpsons episodes "Lady Bouvier's Lover" (1994) (The tune plays as Mr. Burns cuts in to a dance between Grampa Simpson and Mrs. Bouvier.), "Make Room for Lisa" (1999) (The tune playing on the radio when Homer mistakenly thinks from a radio broadcast that he traveled back in time), and "Coming to Homerica" (2009) (Plays in the background while a wall is constructed between Shelbyville and Ogdenville)
Baseball (1994) The song is heard in the Sixth Inning when recounting Joe DiMaggio and his 56-game hitting streak.
Bert (1994) (Episode 5: "Min älskling du är som en tulipan")
The X-Files (1998) (Season 6, episode 3: "Triangle")
Everybody Loves Raymond (1999) (Season 3, episode 24: "Dancing with Debra")
Gilmore Girls (2002) (Season 3, episode 7: "They Shoot Gilmores, Don't They?")
Guinness advert "Moth" (2004)
The Sopranos Season 6, episode 15: "Remember When" (2007) (Plays during the closing scene.)
The Man in the High Castle Season 3, episode 3: "Sensô Kôi" (2018)
The Marvelous Mrs. Maisel Season 2, episode 4 "We're going to the Catskills" (2018) during the initial dance
Dead to Me Season 1, episode 9 (2019) (The song plays over the opening scenes.)
NCIS Season 17, episode 8 "Musical Chairs" (2019) (Once at beginning and again at end of episode)
Hollywood Season 1, episode 2 "Hooray for Hollywood: Part 2" (2020) (Once, third of the way into episode, transition from screening room to studio cafeteria)
Penny Dreadful: City of Angels, Season 1, episode 9 "Sing, Sing, Sing"
Takt Op. Destiny, episode 2
The Good Cop (Israeli TV series) (2015) theme tune (uses the James Horner recording, from the soundtrack of Swing Kids (1993)).
SAS: Rogue Heroes (2022) episode 1, about 30 minutes into the episode at The Empire.

Video games 

 Donkey Konga (2004)
 Mafia II (2010) (plays on the fictional Empire Central Radio during the 1940s segment of the game)
 LA Noire (2011) (plays on KTI Radio)

See also
List of 1930s jazz standards

References

1930s jazz standards
1936 songs
Benny Goodman songs
Grammy Hall of Fame Award recipients
Songs written by Louis Prima
Swing jazz standards